The Pooch and the Pauper is a 2000 American television film, starring Richard Karn, Fred Willard, Vincent Schiavelli, Peter MacNicol and Daryl Mitchell. It was directed by Alex Zamm. The off-screen names of the two starring dogs in the film are Screamer and Petey.

Plot
Adaptation of the Mark Twain classic story,  The Prince and the Pauper. But now the story is set in the present time and have dogs as the protagonists. Liberty, "The First Dog" and Moocher, a street dog, have their lives turned upside down when they change places by mistake.

Cast
 Richard Karn as Agent Dainville
 Fred Willard as The President
 Vincent Schiavelli as Willy Wishbow
 Cody Jones as Nate
 Carolyn Dunn as Mary
 Laura Press as Margaret Caldwell
 Peter MacNicol as Liberty (Voice)
 Daryl Mitchell as Moocher (Voice)
 George Wendt as Sheldon Sparks

Reception
Robert Pardi from TV Guide gave the film two out of four, concluding: "Anyone who believes our four-legged friends can manipulate human behavior will enjoy this mongrel diversion that combines moral lessons with frisky comedy."

References

External links

 

2000s English-language films
American television films
Fictional duos
Films directed by Alex Zamm